The White Renegade (Spanish: El renegado blanco) is a 1960 Mexican adventure film directed by Fernando Méndez and starring Mauricio Garcés, Abel Salazar and Rafael Baledón.

Cast
 Mauricio Garcés as Juan  
 Abel Salazar as Julio  
 Rafael Baledón as José  
 Martha Roth 
 Luis Aragón 
 Renée Dumas 
 Begoña Palacios 
 Carlos Nieto 
 Guillermo Rivas 
 Eduardo Alcaraz 
 David Reynoso 
 Virma González
 Ángel Di Stefani 
 José Dupeyrón 
 Tito Novaro 
 Salvador Terroba 
 Antonio Badú 
 Fernando Galiana
 Emilio Garibay
 Carlos Robles Gil

References

Bibliography 
 Emilio García Riera. Historia documental del cine mexicano: 1959-1960. Universidad de Guadalajara, 1994.

External links 
 

1960 films
1960 adventure films
Mexican adventure films
1960s Spanish-language films
Films directed by Fernando Méndez
1960s Mexican films